Godsdog is the second studio album by electronic band De-Phazz. It was released in 1999.

Track listing 

De-Phazz albums
1999 albums